The 1941 All-Ireland Senior Football Championship Final was the 54th All-Ireland Final and the deciding match of the 1941 All-Ireland Senior Football Championship, an inter-county Gaelic football tournament for the top teams in Ireland.

Route to the final
Kerry required a replay to defeat Dublin in the All-Ireland semi-final. The first game was held at Croke Park on 10 August; the replay in Tralee the following Sunday, 17 August. This was the last All-Ireland semi-final replay played outside Croke Park until 1983, when Dublin contested a semi-final replay against Cork at Páirc Uí Chaoimh.

P. D. Mehigan (or "Pat'O") wrote of the first game: "At the very last minute Murt Kelly drove high at the Dublin posts and the ball glanced off the upright for the balancing point. Dublin had played the better football but both sets of forwards shot wildly when well placed. As I anticipated here last week, it was a low-scoring game and without a goal, and the backs had far the better of the argument throughout. Keohane, Myers, Casey and Dillon shone in Kerry's defence whilst Kennedy, Falvey, Murphy and Quinn played steady football for Dublin".

20,000 people attended the replay; half of Dublin's team spent the night before in Limerick and landed late after a trip on a wartime turf-trains. Pat'O recorded Dublin as being "outclassed" by a scoreline of 2–9 to 0–3. When Tom O'Connor scored a goal in the twentieth minute, it was — he wrote — "the beginning of the end".

Dublin, incidentally, were not Leinster Senior Football Championship winners as would usually have been the case for an All-Ireland semi-finalist; the province nominated them to play Kerry due to an outbreak of foot-and-mouth disease. (The 1941 Leinster final, Dublin v Carlow, was held in November, with Dublin winning by 4–6 to 1–4).

Match

Summary
Kerry completed a three-in-a-row with a goal by Tom O'Connor. The attendance was affected by restrictions under "The Emergency", with a thousand fans travelling by peat-fueled train, and two Kerrymen cycling a tandem bicycle from Killarney to Dublin.

It was the second of three All-Ireland football titles won by Kerry in the 1940s.

It was also the second of three consecutive All-Ireland football finals lost by Galway.

With their 1940 win, Kerry had reached 14 All-Ireland titles, drawing level with Dublin. Dublin had been in the lead since 1892. In 1941, Kerry took the lead; Dublin equalled the new total in 1942 but never again managed to surpass Kerry's total.

Details

References

All-Ireland Senior Football Championship Final
All-Ireland Senior Football Championship Final, 1941
All-Ireland Senior Football Championship Finals
Galway county football team matches
Kerry county football team matches